John A. Buttrick is an American attorney, judge, and former chairman of the Libertarian Party of Arizona.

Buttrick served as a part-time United States magistrate judge for the United States District Court for the District of Arizona from August 17, 2012 until August 16, 2016.

Education and career
Buttrick received his J.D. from Harvard Law School in 1976 and a bachelor's degree in Philosophy from the University of Denver in 1973. Before his appointment to the bench, Buttrick was a partner at the law firm Brown and Bain (now Perkins Coie). In 2001, Governor Jane Dee Hull appointed Buttrick to the Maricopa Superior Court. He served in this position until he accepted an appointment as a federal magistrate in 2012.

In the 1990s Buttrick served on the Libertarian National Committee and as Chair of the National Platform Committee.

Elections
 Retained as a superior court judge in 2004 and 2008.
 Libertarian candidate for the Arizona House of Representatives in 1998
 Libertarian nominee for Governor of Arizona in 1994, receiving 3.1% of the vote.

References

External links
 Biography
 Libertarian Officer website

Year of birth missing (living people)
Living people
Arizona Libertarians
Arizona lawyers
United States magistrate judges
Harvard Law School alumni
University of Denver alumni
State political party chairs of Arizona
People associated with Perkins Coie